The 2006 NORCECA Men’s Continental Beach Volleyball Tournament was held from April 14 to 16 2006 in Boca Chica, Dominican Republic.

Final ranking
 A total number of 8 participating couples

See also
 NORCECA Beach Volleyball Circuit

References

North America
Beach
NORCECA Beach Volleyball Circuit
International volleyball competitions hosted by the Dominican Republic